Gregory Goldhawk was Canada's second resident Ambassador in Mongolia, succeeding Anna Biolik, from 2010 to 2014. He previously served in Canada's diplomatic missions in Philadelphia, Pennsylvania; Washington, D.C.; Athens, Greece; Sydney, Australia; Atlanta, Georgia, and Bangkok, Thailand. His posting subsequent to Ulaanbaatar was Johannesburg, South Africa, where he served as the Head of Office at the High Commission of Canada.  Now retired from the Canadian diplomatic service, he is President of Trinsyc Strategic Communications.

Goldhawk  has a BA in Political Science from Carleton University (1977), an MA in International Affairs from Carleton University (1979) and an MBA from Western University (1981).

External links 
 Canada: Diplomatic Appointments

Living people
Carleton University alumni
Ambassadors of Canada to Mongolia
Year of birth missing (living people)